This is a list of British television related events from 1968.
Lost in space debut was 19 August 1968 on Thames tv

Events

January
1 January – The colour television licence is introduced when a £5 "colour supplement" is added to the £5 monochrome licence fee, therefore making the cost of a colour licence £10.
5 January – Gardeners' World is broadcast for the first time. The programme continues to this day.
13 January – Sooty, Harry Corbett's glove puppet bear, moves from the BBC to ITV following its cancellation the previous year by the controller of BBC 1, Paul Fox.

February
4 February – Cult series The Prisoner finishes its first run on British television.
5 February – BBC2's Newsroom becomes the first news programme in the UK to be broadcast in colour.
12 February – Children's stop-motion animation The Herbs debuts on BBC1.

March
4 March – TWW closes. The station has lost its franchise in the previous ITV licensing awards and decided to close 10 weeks early, selling its remaining airtime to HTV for £500,000, however Harlech is not ready to commence transmissions and to fill the gap an interim service, staffed by former TWW staff, is provided until Harlech's launch on 20 May.
11 March – The popular Yugoslavian and West German produced children's series The White Horses is shown on BBC1.

April
1 April – Reporting Scotland launches on BBC1 Scotland, replacing A Quick Look Round.
6 April – The 13th Eurovision Song Contest is held at the Royal Albert Hall in London. Spain wins the contest with the song La, la, la, performed in Spanish by Massiel after Spanish authorities refuse to allow Joan Manuel Serrat to perform it in Catalan. This year marks the first time the event is broadcast in colour, with several European countries transmitting the event in colour. Because BBC1 does not yet broadcast in colour, BBC2 airs an encore edition of the show in colour the following day.
15 April – BBC1 screen the UK premiere of Alfred Hitchcock's iconic 1960 horror movie Psycho, starring Anthony Perkins and Janet Leigh.
20 April – Conservative MP Enoch Powell makes his infamous Rivers of Blood speech about immigration and anti-discrimination legislation in the United Kingdom. The speech is made at the Midland Hotel in Birmingham to a meeting of the Conservative Political Centre at 2:30pm. The Birmingham-based television company ATV has seen an advance copy of the speech this morning and its news editor has ordered a television crew to go to the venue where they film sections of the speech. The speech provokes great outcry among the British public, making Powell simultaneously one of the most popular and loathed politicians in the country and leading to his rapid dismissal from the Shadow Cabinet by Conservative party leader Edward Heath.

May
4 May – Mary Hopkin performs on the British TV show Opportunity Knocks. Hopkin catches the attention of model Twiggy who recommends her to Beatle Paul McCartney who soon signs Hopkin to Apple Records.
7 May - BBC1 airs the M.R. James ghost story Whistle and I'll Come to You, starring Michael Hordern.
20 May – Harlech (which becomes HTV in 1970) starts its dual service for Wales and the West of England, replacing the interim ITSWW which has itself replaced TWW in March.

June
14 June – BBC1 launch the children's show The Basil Brush Show, featuring mischievous puppet fox Basil.

July
9 July – American time-travel series The Time Tunnel debuts on BBC1.
28 July – Final day on air for ABC which has broadcast to the North and Midlands regions during weekends. The 1968 Contract Round sees the end of weekend franchises in these regions. It is also the last day on air for ATV London which loses its weekend franchise to the newly formed London Weekend Television.
29 July – Granada and ATV broadcast seven days a week to the North-West and Midlands respectively. The North is split into two regions with Granada broadcasting to the North-West and Yorkshire Television broadcasting to the Yorkshire region. It is also the last day on air for Rediffusion, London in the London area.
30 July 
Thames Television goes on air, having taken over the London weekday franchise from Rediffusion, London. Thames is a new joint venture between the respective parent companies of ABC (ABPC, known for the ABC cinema chain) and Rediffusion (British Electric Traction), the ABPC having been awarded the controlling 51% stake in the new London weekday broadcaster but profits shared equally. Thames's evening news program Today, presented by Eamonn Andrews, features Jamaican Barbara Blake Hannah as the first black news presenter on British television.
Children's magazine programme Magpie premieres on ITV.
31 July – Popular sitcom Dad's Army begins its nine-year run on BBC1 with the episode The Man and the Hour.

August
2 August – London Weekend Television takes over the London weekend franchise from ATV. Going on air initially as London Weekend Television, it later adopts the name London Weekend before reverting to its original name (often abbreviated to LWT) in 1978.
3 August – ITV technicians' strike immediately after the 1968 franchise changes. causing a national stoppage. The individual companies are off the air for several weeks and an emergency service is established. The ITV Emergency National Service is presented by management personnel with no regional variations, the first time that a uniform presentation practice has been adopted across all regions. The strike ends on 18 August.
21 August – The BBC's scheduled transmission of the fourth Dad's Army episode is postponed for coverage of the Warsaw Pact invasion of Czechoslovakia.

September
2 September – The Morecambe & Wise Show premieres on BBC2. 
9 September – Translated French children's puppet series Hector's House debuts on BBC1.
14 September – The final editions of Look Westward (Westward Television), The Viewer (Tyne Tees Television), TV Post (Ulster Television), Television Weekly (Harlech Television) and TV World (ATV Midlands) are published for the last time. 
21 September – TVTimes becomes a national publication, as previously some ITV companies have produced their own listings magazines.
29 September – Gerry and Sylvia Anderson's science-fiction Supermarionation series Joe 90 debuts on ITV.

October
12–27 October – The BBC and ITV provide coverage of the 1968 Olympic Games. The BBC's coverage is extensive, with live coverage into the night and a daily breakfast programme Good Morning Mexico. This is also the first time the Games are broadcast in colour, albeit only on BBC2 which simulcasts the majority of BBC1's coverage. This is also the first time that ITV shows the Olympic Games.

November
No events.

December
7 December – American science fiction series Land of the Giants makes its debut on ITV.

Debuts

BBC1
 3 January – Zokko! (1968–1970)
 6 January – The Portrait of a Lady (1968)
 22 January – Hugh and I Spy (1968)
 30 January – Cilla (1968–1976)
 11 February – Nicholas Nickleby (1968)
 12 February – The Herbs (1968)
 11 March – The White Horses (1966-1967) 
 1 April – Reporting Scotland (1968–present)
 7 April – The First Lady (1968–1969)
 7 May - Whistle and I'll Come to You (1968)
 10 May – Thicker Than Water (1968–1969)
 12 May – The Railway Children (1968)
 21 May – Lulu's Back in Town (1968)
 24 May – Wild, Wild Women (1968–1969)
 14 June – 
The Basil Brush Show (1968–1980, 2002–2007)
Me Mammy (1968–1971)
 23 June – The Dave Allen Show (1968)
 30 June – Triton (1968)
 9 July – The Time Tunnel (1966–1967)
 15 July – Ukridge (1968)
 28 July – The Man in the Iron Mask (1968)
 31 July – Dad's Army (1968–1977)
 30 August – The Old Campaigner (1968–1969)
 9 September – Hector's House (1968–1975)
 12 September – Sportsnight (1968–1997)
 13 September – Oh Brother! (1968–1970)
 15 September – Song of Summer (1968)
 29 September – The £1,000,000 Bank Note (1968)
 3 November – Treasure Island (1968)
 18 November – Tom's Midnight Garden (1968)
 25 December – The Harry Secombe Show (1968–1973)
 30 December – Adventure Weekly (1968–1969)

BBC2
5 January – Gardeners' World (1968–present)
15 January – Look and Read: Len and the River Mob (1968)
22 January – The World of Beachcomber (1968–1969)
2 March – Point Counter Point (1968)
19 April – Late Night Horror (1968)
29 April – Marty (1968–1969)
14 June – Colour Me Pop (1968–1969)
22 June – Cold Comfort Farm (1968)
5 July – The Expert (1968–1976)
13 July – Middlemarch (1968)
29 July – The Year of the Sex Olympics (1968) (first shown in Theatre 625 series)
31 August – Nana (1968)
2 September – The Morecambe & Wise Show (1968–1977)
8 September – Rowan & Martin's Laugh-In (1968–1973)
10 September – The Jazz Age (1968) (Anthology series)
11 September – A Touch of Venus (1968) (Anthology shorts)
27 September – Scene (1968–2002) (Anthology series)
10 October – Jazz at the Maltings (1968–1969)
28 October – Broaden Your Mind (1968–1969)
16 November – Resurrection (1968)
28 December – The Tenant of Wildfell Hall (1968–1969)
31 December – The Borderers (1968–1970)

ITV
4 January – A Man of our Times (1968)
5 February – Rogues' Gallery (1968–1969)
28 February – The Flight of the Heron (1968)
28 March – Virgin of the Secret Service (1968)
3 April – The Ronnie Barker Playhouse (1968)
4 April – Freewheelers (1968–1973)
19 April – Spindoe (1968)
17 June – Devil-in-the-Fog (1968)
12 July – The War of Darkie Pilbeam (1968)
30 July – Magpie (1968–1980)
31 July – Frontier (1968)
1 August – The Queen Street Gang (1968)
2 August – Gazette (1968)
6 August – Best of Enemies (1968)
10 August –  Never a Cross Word  (1968–1970)
15 August – Nearest and Dearest (1968–1973)
19 August - Lost in Space
21 August – Tom Grattan's War (1968–1970)
25 August – The Big Match (1968–1992)
22 September – The Caesars (1968)
24 September – 
How We Used To Live (1968–2002)
Inside George Webley (1968–1970)
25 September 
 The Champions (1968–1969)
 Her Majesty's Pleasure  (1968–1969)
29 September – Joe 90 (1968–1969)
1 October – The Root of All Evil? (1968–1969)
28 October – Houseparty (1968–1981; 1993–1995)
November - Sugarball The Jungle Boy (1968-1969)
5 November – Father, Dear Father (1968–1973)
8 November – Please Sir! (1968–1972)
16 November – Journey to the Unknown (1968–1969)
5 December – High Living (1968–1971)
7 December – Land of the Giants (1968–1970)

Television shows

Returning this year after a break of one year or longer
Scott On (1964–1965; 1968–1972; 1974)

Continuing television shows

1920s
BBC Wimbledon (1927–1939, 1946–2019, 2021–2024)

1930s
The Boat Race (1938–1939, 1946–2019)
BBC Cricket (1939, 1946–1999, 2020–2024)

1940s
Come Dancing (1949–1998)

1950s
Andy Pandy (1950–1970, 2002–2005)
Watch with Mother (1952–1975) 
The Good Old Days (1953–1983)
Panorama (1953–present)
Dixon of Dock Green (1955–1976)
Crackerjack (1955–1984, 2020–present)
Opportunity Knocks (1956–1978, 1987–1990)
This Week (1956–1978, 1986–1992)
Armchair Theatre (1956–1974)
What the Papers Say (1956–2008)
The Sky at Night (1957–present)
Blue Peter (1958–present)
Grandstand (1958–2007)

1960s
Coronation Street (1960–present)
The Avengers (1961–1969)
Songs of Praise (1961–present)
The Saint (1962–1969)
Z-Cars (1962–1978)
Animal Magic (1962–1983)
Doctor Who (1963–1989, 1996, 2005–present)
World in Action (1963–1998)
The Wednesday Play (1964–1970)
Top of the Pops (1964–2006)
Match of the Day (1964–present)
Crossroads (1964–1988, 2001–2003)
Play School (1964–1988)
Mr. and Mrs. (1965–1999)
The Newcomers (1965–1969)
Public Eye (1965–1975)
World of Sport (1965–1985)
Sportsnight (1965–1997)
Softly, Softly (1966–1969)
The Trumptonshire Trilogy (1966–1969)
Jackanory (1965–1996, 2006)
It's a Knockout (1966–1982, 1999–2001)
The Money Programme (1966–2010)
Market in Honey Lane (1967–1969)
Not in Front of the Children (1967–1970)
Never Mind the Quality, Feel the Width (1967–1971)
The Golden Shot (1967–1975)
Playhouse (1967–1982)

Ending this year
 Take Your Pick! (1955–1968, 1992–1998)
 Double Your Money (1955–1968)
 White Heather Club (1958–1968)
 Danger Man (1960–1961, 1964–1968)
 Theatre 625 (1964–1968)
 Beggar My Neighbour (1966–1968)
 At Last the 1948 Show (1967–1968)
 Captain Scarlet and the Mysterons (1967–1968)
 Man in a Suitcase (1967–1968)
 Pinky and Perky (1967–1968)
 The Prisoner (1967–1968)

Births
 30 January – Tony Maudsley, actor
 3 February – David Scarboro, actor (died 1988)
 29 February – Wendi Peters, actress
 4 March – Patsy Kensit, English actress
 11 March – Dominic Mafham, actor
 21 March – Jaye Davidson, British actor
 23 March – Abigail Cruttenden, actress
 3 April – Charlotte Coleman, actress (died 2001)
 8 April – Jenny Powell, television presenter
 17 April – Lee Whitlock, actor (died 2023)
 22 April – Amanda Mealing, actress
 23 April – Ricky Groves, actor
 4 May – Julian Barratt, comedian and actor
 12 May – Catherine Tate, comedian
 15 May – Sophie Raworth, journalist and newsreader
 22 May – Graham Linehan, Irish writer and director
 7 June – Sarah Parish, actress
 28 June – Adam Woodyatt, actor
 4 July – Ronni Ancona, actress and impressionist
 20 July – Julian Rhind-Tutt, film, television and radio actor
 26 July – Olivia Williams, actress
 4 August – Lee Mack, comedian and actor
 5 August – Stephanie Flanders, broadcast journalist
 9 August 
Gillian Anderson, British actress (born in the U.S.)
Kate Gerbeau, television presenter and newsreader
 11 August – Gray O'Brien, actor
 14 August – Adrian Lester, British actor
 17 August – Helen McCrory, actress (died 2021)
 20 August – Sharat Sardana, comedy scriptwriter (died 2009)
 21 August – Laura Trevelyan, BBC journalist
 9 September – Julia Sawalha, English actress, sister of Nadia Sawalha 
 20 September – Philippa Forrester, British TV presenter
 23 September – Yvette Fielding, television presenter and actress
 28 September – Shiulie Ghosh, television journalist
 1 October – Mark Durden-Smith, British television presenter
 2 October – Victoria Derbyshire, radio and television presenter
 19 October – Kacey Ainsworth, British actress
 20 October – Susan Tully, television producer and director, previously actress
 12 November – Jo Coburn, journalist and broadcaster
 22 November
Andrew Gilligan, British journalist
Sarah Smith, Scottish journalist
 23 November – Kirsty Young, television presenter
 12 December – Kate Humble, television presenter
 18 December – Nina Wadia, actress and comedian 
 Unknown – Melanie Stace, television presenter

See also
 1968 in British music
 1968 in British radio
 1968 in the United Kingdom
 List of British films of 1968

References